RFA Wave King (A182) was a Wave-class fleet support tanker of the Royal Fleet Auxiliary built at Govan by Harland & Wolff Ltd. In 1945, she served in the Far East with the British Pacific Fleet, designated Task Force 57 upon joining the United States fleet. On 6 May 1945 Wave King and Wave Monarch were with the Logistic Support Group 300 miles south-east of Miyako to refuel Task Force 57 which was launching air strikes against island targets in the Okinawa campaign.

Wave King struck a rock north of São Luís de Maranhão, Brazil, on 9 August 1956 and suffered severe damage. She was withdrawn from service as a result and was laid up at Portsmouth later in 1956. She arrived at Barrow-in-Furness on 16 April 1960 for scrapping.

References

Wave-class oilers
Tankers of the Royal Fleet Auxiliary
1944 ships
Ministry of War Transport ships
Ships built in Govan
Ships built by Harland and Wolff
Maritime incidents in 1956